Gervais Ndirakobuca (born 1970) is a Burundian former rebel commander and police commissioner serving as the Prime Minister of Burundi since 7 September 2022. Prior to that, he was the Minister of Interior, Public Security, and Community Development. He is known for his violent crackdown of the 2015 civil protest in Burundi and was under United States and European Union sanctions for human rights violations when President Évariste Ndayishimiye appointed him security minister.

Biography 

Gervais Ndirakobuca was born in 1970 in Bukinanyana in the Cibitoke Province of Burundi.

He was a rebel commander during the Burundian Civil War that ended in 2005. His nickname was "Ndakugarika" meaning 'I will kill you' in the Kirundi language. After the civil war ended, he joined the National Police of Burundi and rose to the rank of Commissioner (lieutenant-general). He was addressed as General.

As police commissioner, he deployed excessive force to quell the 2015 civil protests that followed the amendment of the constitution which gave President Pierre Nkurunziza the legal right to run for a third term. Sanctions were imposed on Ndirakobuca by the United States, the United Kingdom, France, Switzerland and the European Union for "acts of violence, acts of repression and violations of international human rights law against protesters … on 26, 27 and 28 April in the Nyakabiga and Musaga districts in Bujumbura". At least 1,700 people were killed during the protest. International Criminal Court opened an investigation against government officials involved in the crackdown including Ndirakobuca.

Despite this, Ndayishimiye appointed him to a powerful position of Minister of Interior in June 2020, making Ndirakobuca the most internationally sanctioned member of Burundi national government cabinet. He was seen as a de facto deputy prime minister or 'super minister' with his overwhelming portfolio across three key ministries of Interior, Security, and Community Development in the Nkurunziza's government, but was merged into a single ministry by Ndayishimiye and given to Ndirakobuca.

Ndirakobuca became prime minister of Burundi on 7 September 2022, replacing incumbent Prime Minister Alain-Guillaume Bunyoni, after Ndayishimiye warned that a coup d'état was being planned against his government. Ndirakobuca was unanimously voted to the position by the parliament.

References 

Prime Ministers of Burundi
Living people
1970 births
Interior ministers of Burundi
People of the Burundian Civil War